An Honourable Murder is a 1960 British drama film directed by Godfrey Grayson and starring Norman Wooland, Margaretta Scott and Lisa Daniely. It is a modern reworking of William Shakespeare's Julius Caesar set in the corporate world of the City of London.

Cast
 Norman Wooland – Brutus Smith 
 Margaretta Scott – Claudia Caesar 
 Lisa Daniely – Paula 
 Douglas Wilmer – Cassius 
 Philip Saville – Mark Anthony 
 John Longden – Julian Caesar 
 Marion Mathie – Portia Smith 
 Colin Tapley – Casca 
 Kenneth Edwards – Trebon 
 Arnold Bell – Ligar

References

External links

1960 films
1960 drama films
British drama films
1960s English-language films
British films based on plays
Films directed by Godfrey Grayson
Films shot at New Elstree Studios
1960s British films